David J. Gavaghan (born 10 February 1966) is Professor of Computational Biology in the Department of Computer Science at the University of Oxford. He is also the director of the Life Sciences Interface Doctoral Training Centre, Principal Investigator of the Integrative Biology project and Research Fellow in Mathematics at New College, Oxford.

Education 
Gavaghan completed his undergraduate degree in Mathematics at Durham University in 1986. This was followed by a Master of Science in Numerical Analysis and Mathematical Modelling in 1987 and his Doctor of Philosophy on the development of Parallel Numerical Algorithms in 1991 at Linacre College  at the University of Oxford.

Research and career 
Gavaghan's research is interdisciplinary and involves the application of mathematical and computational techniques to problems in the biomedical sciences. Gavaghan serves on the advisory board chair for the Software Sustainability Institute (SSI).

References 

1966 births
Living people
British bioinformaticians
Alumni of Grey College, Durham
Fellows of New College, Oxford
Members of the Department of Computer Science, University of Oxford
Alumni of Linacre College, Oxford